The women's high jump field event at the 1960 Olympic Games took place on September 8.

Results
Top 12 jumpers and ties and all jumpers clearing 1.65 metres advanced to the finals. All heights are listed in metres.

Qualifying

Final

Key: OR = Olympic record; o = clear ; p = pass; x = fail

References

M
High jump at the Olympics
1960 in women's athletics
Women's events at the 1960 Summer Olympics